Schutt Sports (trade name of Kranos Corporation) was a United States company that manufactured protective gear for several sports, focusing on American football, baseball, softball, and lacrosse. Products manufactured by company, headquartered in Litchfield, Illinois, included helmets and other protections such as jockstraps, and shoulder pads. The company also produced American football sportswear including jerseys and pants.

Established in 1918 as a basketball equipment manufacturer, during its existence Schutt signed agreements with sports leagues such as Major League Baseball and American Amateur Baseball Congress in the 2010s. Nevertheless, the COVID-19 pandemic affected the company's operations severely so it filled for bankruptcy in December 2020.

History 
The company was established in 1918 as a basketball hoop and dry line developer. It created the first football faceguard in 1935. In 2008, competitor Riddell sued Schutt for infringing on three patents. The three products identified were branded by Schutt under the names "DNA", "ION", and "AIR XP". Two years later, the company sued Riddell, also for patent-infringement. However, Schutt ended up losing in the lawsuit, forcing them to file bankruptcy. Despite this, football helmets and facemask sales in 2011 increased by 15%. After the bankruptcy, Platinum Equity acquired the assets of the company in September 2018. In December 2020, it was announced that Innovatus Capital Partners, LLC, had acquired the assets of Kranos Corporation including its brands Schutt, ProGear Shoulder Pads, Tucci Bats, Hollywood Bases and Adams USA.

While Schutt was able to emerge from its initial bankruptcy filing and secure new business, such as a 2018 deal with Major League Baseball to supply bases, home plates and pitching rubbers, the company was not able to withstand the damage to its business wrought by the COVID-19 pandemic. On December 18, 2020, Kranos Corporation, which had done business as Schutt Sports, filed for Chapter 7 liquidation. In the petition filed with the court, the company listed $1,219,773 in assets and $58,342,153 in liabilities; as noted by SGI News, the assets consisted entirely of Zamst inventory, a line of sports braces and related sports medicine products that Schutt agreed to distribute exclusively under a multi-year contract with Nippon Sigmax.

Concussion prevention 

Schutt has been active in developing equipment to prevent concussions in American football, including creating a device in 2008 for Arena Football League players called the "Shockometer". The device is shaped like a triangle, with an adhesive on one side, that sticks to the helmet. When a player is hit by a g-force of more than 100 g, a light in a capsule on the device will flash red. However, fan activity could potentially affect the device.

In 2012, the company developed a helmet line called "Vengeance", which the company stated will give players "the opportunity to face their foes head-on." Critics and doctors questioned the model's marketing, saying that the statement, as well as the name, can give the wrong message. However, Schutt CEO Robert Erb stated that the name stems from the competition between Schutt and Riddell, and that the name will not appear on the helmet.

Sponsorships 
The company's basketball equipment was used by various athletic associations; Schutt's rims were the official rims of the SEC men's and women's basketball tournaments. The company was also sponsor of the Illinois High School Association Schutt Sports Slam Dunk Spectacular dunk contest. The Philadelphia 76ers frequently used Schutt's equipment during their summer camps, and was the preferred equipment of the Missouri Valley Conference. Schutts also developed equipment for the United States men's national softball team/women's softball teams, and developed the Aqua Tech helmet in 2012 for the women's team.

See also
 Riddell Sports Group

References

External links
 

Sporting goods manufacturers of the United States
Litchfield, Illinois
Design companies established in 1918
Manufacturing companies established in 1918
1918 establishments in Illinois